Asterophila japonica is a species of sea snail, a marine gastropod mollusk in the family Eulimidae. The species is one of three known species within the genus Asterophila, the other congeneric species being Asterophila perknasteri and Asterophila rathbunasteri.

Distribution
This mollusk's anatomy and its reported distribution has changed over time. It was once thought to have lived in the Atlantic Ocean around New Jersey. But now new evidence has shown that this species lives in starfish around the Asiatic Coast of the Pacific Ocean.

Anatomy
This species has now been proven to be very similar to those in the families Melanellidae-Entoconchidae, so it is not necessary to allocate it its own family as the taxonomist Thiele did in 1929. However, there are some similarities and some differences. The larva is a typical veliger with smaller lobes like the Melanellidae-Entoconchidae. However this larva has a pericardium and a kidney.

References

External links
 To World Register of Marine Species

Eulimidae
Gastropods described in 1912